Christopher Butler may refer to

Christopher Butler (1902–1986), English bishop and monk 
Christopher Butler (literary scholar) (1940–2020), English academic, Professor of English Language and Literature at the University of Oxford
Christopher Butler (private investigator), American detective

See also
Chris Butler (disambiguation)